Laree may refer to:

 Larée, a village and commune in France
 Lari (fish hook money), an obsolete coinage used around the Arabian sea
 Georgian lari, a unit of currency
 Maldivian laari, a unit of currency

See also
 Lari (disambiguation)